They Fight Like Soldiers, They Die Like Children is a non-fiction book by the Canadian politician and former general Romeo Dallaire (and Jessica Dee Humphreys) about the child-soldier phenomenon. The book contains a foreword by Ishmael Beah, an ex child soldier and author of A Long Way Gone: Memoirs of a Boy Soldier.

References

2010 non-fiction books
Works about child soldiers
Works about the Rwandan genocide
Roméo Dallaire
Canadian non-fiction books